Golli may refer to:

 Goli, Iran (disambiguation), several villages also spelled as "Golli"
 Golli myelin basic protein (Golli-MBP; or "golli"), an expression of MBP, myelin basic protein
 Ramesh Golli, a sprint kayaker for India at the 2014 Asian Games

See also

 Gollis, Lyngseidet, Lyngen, Troms og Finnmark, Norway; a tourist attraction
 Gollis University, Hargeisa, Somaliland, Somalia
 
 Goli (disambiguation)